Watson Fothergill (12 July 1841 – 6 March 1928) was a British architect who designed over 100 unique buildings in Nottingham in the East Midlands of England, his influences were mainly from the Gothic Revival and Old English vernacular architecture styles.

His work dates from 1864 (when he set himself up in practice) to around 1912. His earliest surviving known building dates from 1866.

Early life

Born Fothergill Watson in Mansfield, Nottinghamshire in 1841, he was the son of wealthy Nottingham Lace merchant Robert Watson and Mary Ann Fothergill. He changed his name to Watson Fothergill in 1892 to continue his maternal family name.

Family
He married Anne Hage in 1867 at St. John's Church, Mansfield. They had the following children:
Marian Watson (1868–1955)
Annie Forbes Watson (1869–1930)
Edith Mary Watson (1871–1936)
Eleanor Fothergill Watson (1872–1946)
Samuel Fothergill Watson (1875–1915)
Harold H Watson (1877-1905)
Clarice Watson (1877–1955)

His father-in-law was Samuel Hage, one of the founding partners of Mansfield Brewery.

His half-brother was Robert Mackie Watson, chairman of the Mansfield Improvement Commission and the Brunts' Charity.

Career

In 1856, he entered the St Peter’s Gate office of Frederick Jackson, an architect and surveyor in Nottingham. In mid-1860 he moved as assistant to Isaac Charles Gilbert who was based in Clinton Street, Nottingham. After spending around 18 months with Gilbert, he moved in early 1862 to join the office of Arthur William Blomfield in London. In 1864 he was working with John Middleton in Cheltenham, but in the same year, left to set up his own office at 6 Clinton Street, Nottingham. He remained at Clinton Street until it was demolished by the works in connection with the arrival of the Great Central Railway in 1894. He moved to a new temporary office at 18 George Street and arranged to rebuild 15 George Street opposite which he completed the next year and moved in on 12 December 1895.

He was in partnership with Lawrence George Summers from 1880 and he retired in 1912.

He is credited as having had a great impact on the architecture of the major British industrial city of Nottingham, and designed over a hundred buildings in the city, from offices, banks and warehouses, to churches and private dwelling houses. His easily recognisable style includes the use of contrasting horizontal bands of red and blue brick, dark timber eaves and balconies, and elaborate turrets and stone carving.

On his death in 1928, he left an estate valued at £73,908 5s 11d.

List of major works

All Nottinghamshire unless otherwise stated.

1860s

 Cemetery Chapels, High Street, Ongar (joint architect with Isaac Charles Gilbert) – 1866

1870s

 Dwelling House, Mapperley Road, Nottingham (Fothergill's own house) – 1870
 Two Villas, 5 & 7 Lenton Road, The Park, Nottingham – 1873
 Temperance Hall (later Albert Hall), North Circus Street, Nottingham – 1873–1876
 Nottingham and Nottinghamshire Bank, Church Street, Mansfield – 1874–1875
 Nottingham Daily Express Offices, Printing Works and Shops, Parliament Street, Nottingham – 1875
 King's Arms, Ratcliffe Gate and Newgate Lane, Mansfield – 1875–1877
 Cattle Market, Nottingham Road, Mansfield – 1876–1878
 Congregational Church (later United Reformed), Westgate, Mansfield – 1876–1878
 Nottingham and Nottinghamshire Bank and Residence, Thurland Street, Nottingham – 1877–1882

1880s

 Villa, Crow Hill Drive, Mansfield – 1880
 Six Dwelling Houses, Shops and Carriage House, Castle Road and Houndsgate, Nottingham – 1882–1883
 Five Houses and Shops, Derby Road, Nottingham – 1884
 Institute and Coffee Tavern, High Street, Hucknall – 1884
 Nottingham and Nottinghamshire Bank, Cattle Market, Loughborough, Leicestershire – 1885
 Villa, Loscoe Hill (Clawson Lodge), 405 Mansfield Road, Nottingham – 1885
 Institute and Coffee Tavern (Budworth Hall), High Street, Ongar, Epping Forest, Essex – 1885–1887
 Villa (Walton House), 39 Newcastle Drive, The Park, Nottingham – 1886
 St. Nicholas' Church Rectory, Castle Gate, Nottingham – 1886–1887
 Pair of Villas, Loscoe Hill, 409 and 411 Mansfield Road, Nottingham – 1886–1887
 Nottingham and Nottinghamshire Bank, Kirk Gate, Newark on Trent 1885–1887
 Rebuilding Black Boy Hotel (first major rebuild / extension), Long Row, Nottingham – 1886–1888
 Pair of Villas, 62 and 64 Castle Boulevard, Nottingham – C1888
 Pair of Villas, 3 and 4 Huntingdon Drive, Nottingham – C1888
 Samuel Smith & Co's Bank, 24 Market Place, Long Eaton, Derbyshire – 1889
 Warehouse (Milbie House), Pilcher Gate, Nottingham – 1889

1890s

 Villa, (Elberton House), Cavendish Hill, 9 Hardwick Road, Nottingham – 1890
 Eight Ladies' Homes – Norris Almhouses, Berridge Road, Nottingham – 1892–1893
 Emmanuel Church, Woodborough Road (1883–1893) – demolished 1972
 Woodborough Road Baptist Church, Woodborough Road and Alfred Street North, Nottingham – 1893–1895
 Simons and Pickard Paper Warehouse, Lenton (Castle) Boulevard, Nottingham – 1893–1894
 House, Kingswood, Bulcote – 1893
 Two Semi-Detached Villas (Cleave House), 1 and 3 Sherwood Rise, Nottingham – 1894–1895
 Rebuilding of Nos 15 & 17 George Street, Nottingham (Watson Fothergill's offices) – 1894–1895
 Jessops' Shop and Workrooms, 14–30 King Street, Nottingham – 1894–1897
 Four Shops and Offices (Queen's Chambers), Long Row and King Street, Nottingham – 1896–1899
 Shop and Office (Furley and Co) (now Lloyds Bank), Parliament Street and Clinton Street, Nottingham – 1896–1897
 Ellenborough House, 3 South Road, The Park, Nottingham – extended 1896–1897
 Cuckson, Hazeldine and Manderfield Warehouses, Stoney Street and Barker Gate, Nottingham – 1897–1898
 Black Boy Hotel Additions and Two Shops (second major rebuild/extension), Long Row, Nottingham – 1897–1900
 Rebuilding of the Rose of England Inn, Mansfield Road, Nottingham – 1898–1900
 Brewery, Mar Hill, Carlton – 1899
 Nottingham and Nottinghamshire Bank and House, 111 Carrington Street, Nottingham – 1899

1900s

 Nottingham and Nottinghamshire Branch Bank, St Ann's Well Road, Nottingham – 1900–1901
 Sixteen Houses, Foxhall Road, Nottingham – 1901–1902
 Union of London and Smith's Bank, Market Place, Bulwell – 1904
 Villa, Mapperley Road, Nottingham (Joint Architect with Lawrence George Summers) – 1905
 Four Houses, Mansfield Road and Bingham Road, Nottingham – 1906–1907

Gallery

Further reading
Brand, Ken (2009) "Watson Fothergill: a provincial goth", in: Ferry, Kathryn, ed. Powerhouses of Provincial Architecture, 1837–1914. London: Victorian Society; pp. 28–43
Turner, Darren (2012) "A Catalogue of the Works of Watson Fothergill, Architect."

References

External links
The Watson Fothergill Home Page
A catalogue of Watson Fothergill's work
Norris Ladies Almshouses, Berridge Road, Nottingham on Google Street View.
Clawson Lodge, Watcombe Road, Nottingham on Google Street View
21 and 23 Newcastle Drive, The Park, Nottingham on Google Street View
39 Newcastle Drive, The Park, Nottingham on Google Street View
Edale House, Clumber Road East, The Park, Nottingham on Google Street View
No 3, South Road, The Park, Nottingham on Google Street View
No. 5 and No. 7 Lenton Road, The Park, Nottingham on Google Street View
No. 3 and No. 4 Huntingdon Drive, The Park, Nottingham on Google Street View
93–95 Derby Road, Nottingham on Google Street View
   The 'Buildings' section of Nottingham21 Web Site has photographs of most of the surviving Fothergill buildings in the city.
 A collection of photographs of Fothergill buildings on Geograph UK

1841 births
1928 deaths
People from Mansfield
Architects from Nottinghamshire
Architects from Nottingham